Andrew Chiariglione (24 December 1879 – 12 April 1935), usually known as Fireman Jim Flynn, was an American boxer of the early twentieth century who twice attempted to take the World Heavyweight Title without success.  He is often remembered as the only boxer to ever knock out the formidable Jack Dempsey.

Professional career
A native of Hoboken, New Jersey, Flynn's first recorded fight was in 1899.  Beginning his career in earnest by 1900, he was working as a railroad fireman in Pueblo, Colorado at the time.

Flynn was a relatively short but sturdy, tough, and clever light heavyweight who took on the greatest boxers of his era.

First attempt at World Heavyweight Title, October 1906

He was first offered a shot at the World Heavyweight Title by heavyweight champion Tommy Burns. They met on 2 October 1906 in Los Angeles, California, with Burns stopping Flynn in the 15th round. The fight was an exciting one from the start, and Flynn was nearly down for the count more than once in the fourteenth.  In the fifteenth round, Burns knocked Flynn to the canvas in the center of the ring for a full ten minutes before he could be revived. According to the Los Angeles Times, Burns was "given one of the hardest battles of his career", and "up to the fourteenth round Flynn was a strong as Burns".  Flynn took terrible punishment in the fourteenth and final fifteenth round, however.<ref>"Burns Knocks Out Flynn in the Fifteenth Round", Los Angeles Times', Los Angeles, California, pg. 6, 3 October 1906</ref>

Flynn met Jack "Twin" Sullivan three times in 1906–07, drawing twice, and beating him once on points.

On 14 July 1909, Flynn met future Hall of Fame boxer Billy Papke in a ten-round Draw according to the Los Angeles Herald.  The Los Angeles Times'', however, gave the bout to Papke, as did the United Press.  He had previously defeated Papke by newspaper decision on 19 March of that year in Los Angeles.

Flynn fought the highly rated Sam Langford in 1908 and twice more in 1910, losing twice and gaining a draw in their second match.

Second attempt at World Heavyweight Title, July 1912

On 4 July 1912, in one of his most important bouts, Flynn challenged for the World Heavyweight Title a second time against Jack Johnson in Las Vegas, New Mexico. Despite being warned by the referee, Flynn continually attempted to headbutt Johnson, and the local sheriff eventually stepped in during the ninth round to stop the fight in Johnson's favor. Johnson won the fight decisively and was barely touched by the fists of Flynn, who was repeatedly the victim of Johnson's blows.

He continued to fight rated contenders including Battling Levinsky, Jack Dillon and Gunboat Smith.

Knockout victory over Jack Dempsey, February 1917
Flynn knocked out Jack Dempsey in a first round win in Murray, Utah, on 13 February 1917.  Charging Dempsey from the opening bell, Flynn pushed Dempsey into position with his right, and knocked him out with a left to the chin, twenty-five seconds into the first round.  Both boxers may have been distracted by a late start to the fight which began at midnight.  Dempsey later denied having thrown the fight and said he lost because he was unable to warm up properly before the match and that he had injured his hand earlier setting pins in a bowling alley. Flynn became the only fighter to ever knock out Dempsey.  Although boxing historian Monte Cox and others have questioned the legitimacy of the result claiming a pre-arranged fix, most contemporary historians concede the knockout to Flynn. A year later Flynn met Dempsey again, and this time Dempsey knocked out Flynn in the first round.

Flynn continued to fight into his 40s. He fought three bouts against Sam Langford, losing all three, and beat Tiger Flowers, the future middleweight champion, in 1923. He finally retired in 1925 after a 26-year ring career, with a final record of 76–46–22, including 33 wins by knockout.

He died of a heart attack on 12 April 1935 at the City Hospital in Los Angeles.

Professional boxing record
All information in this section is derived from BoxRec, unless otherwise stated.

Official Record

All newspaper decisions are officially regarded as “no decision” bouts and are not counted in the win/loss/draw column.

Unofficial record

Record with the inclusion of newspaper decisions to the win/loss/draw column.

References

External links

Fireman Jim Flynn at Flickr
 

1879 births
1935 deaths
Boxers from New Jersey
Heavyweight boxers
Sportspeople from Hoboken, New Jersey
American male boxers